Ersilia is a feminine given name.

List of people with the given name 

 Ersilia Caetani Lovatelli (1840–1925), Italian art historian, cultural historian and archaeologist
 Ersilia Cavedagni, Italian-American Italian-American anarcho-feminist
 Ersilia Soudais (born 1988), French politician

See also 

 Ersilia, genus of gastropods

Given names
Feminine given names
French feminine given names
Italian feminine given names